The 1898 Wokingham by-election was held on 30 March 1898 after the death of the incumbent Conservative MP, Sir George Russell.  It was retained by the Conservative candidate Oliver Young.

References

By-elections to the Parliament of the United Kingdom in Berkshire constituencies
March 1898 events
Wokingham
1898 elections in the United Kingdom
1898 in England
19th century in Berkshire